Naughty's Nicest is a compilation album released by Rhino Entertainment containing the greatest hits of hip hop group Naughty by Nature.

Track listing
"O.P.P." – 4:30
"Uptown Anthem" – 3:05
"Everything's Gonna Be Alright" – 4:51
"Guard Your Grill" – 5:03
"Wickedest Man Alive" – 4:20
"Everyday All Day" – 5:41
"1, 2, 3" – 4:44
"Yoke the Joker" – 5:13
"Hip Hop Hooray" – 4:23
"Written on Ya Kitten" – 4:22
"It's On" [Kay Gee Remix] – 3:05
"Poor Man's Poetry" – 2:59
"Feel Me Flow" – 3:33
"Craziest" – 4:08
"Mourn You Til I Join You" – 5:18
"Dirt All by My Lonely" – 3:15

References

Naughty by Nature albums
2003 greatest hits albums
Rhino Entertainment compilation albums